Michal Březina (born 30 March 1990) is a retired Czech figure skater. He is the 2013 European bronze medalist, 2011 Skate America champion, 2009 World Junior silver medalist and four-time Czech national champion. He also won the 2014-15 ISU Challenger Series. Michal represented the Czech Republic at the 2010, 2014, 2018, and 2022 Winter Olympics.

Personal life 
Michal Březina was born on 30 March 1990 in Brno. He is the son of Edita Březinová and Rudolf Březina, a figure skating coach. His younger sister, Eliška Březinová, competes in ladies' single skating. He intends to study sports at university and eventually become a skating coach.

Březina was the best man at the wedding of Anna Cappellini and Ondřej Hotárek in the summer of 2015.

On 19 May 2015, Brezina announced his engagement to his girlfriend, fellow figure skater Danielle Montalbano. They were married on 10 June 2017, at the Royalton.

Career

Early years 
Březina was initially interested in ice hockey after watching the 1998 Winter Olympics, but his father advised him to learn to skate first, and after a few months, he dropped hockey to focus on figure skating.

Březina first landed a triple Salchow at the age of 12, and a triple Axel at 15. In practice, he has worked on a quad toe loop and quad Salchow. He trained in his hometown of Brno with coach Petr Starec and in Oberstdorf, Germany with Karel Fajfr.

2007–2008 season 
Březina won the 2007 Nebelhorn Trophy over compatriot and reigning champion, Tomáš Verner. Two weeks later, he won his first Junior Grand Prix medal, a silver, in Chemnitz. Březina placed sixteenth at his first European Championships. He missed training time because of a broken wrist but was able to compete at the World Junior Championships, where he was fifth.

2008–2009 season 
Březina won both his junior Grand Prix events but was forced to miss the Junior Grand Prix Final and the Czech national championships due to a right knee injury that required surgery. He returned in time for the 2009 Europeans, where he finished tenth, and then set a new personal best at the 2009 Junior Worlds to win the silver medal behind Adam Rippon.

2009–2010 season 
Březina debuted on the senior Grand Prix circuit, finishing fourth at the 2009 Skate Canada International. He won the bronze medal at 2009 NHK Trophy and defeated Tomáš Verner to win the Czech Championship. He finished 4th at the 2010 European Championships. At the 2010 Olympics in Vancouver he came in tenth. Competing at his first senior World Championships, he earned a fourth-place finish with a new personal best score of 236.06.

2010–2011 season 
Březina was forced to withdraw from the 2010 Cup of China after undergoing surgery for a varicose vein in his abdomen. He later withdrew from the 2010 Trophée Eric Bompard as well. He took silver behind Verner at the Czech Championships. At the 2011 European Championships, Březina placed second in the short program but dropped to eighth overall following the free skate. At the 2011 World Championships, he successfully landed two quads, a Salchow and a toe loop, in the long program – his first quads landed in competition – but fell on two jumps toward the end of the program. He finished fourth at the event for the second straight year.

2011–2012 season 
Březina experienced some boot problems during the off-season. He trained mainly in Oberstdorf. He began his season at 2011 Nebelhorn Trophy where he won the silver medal. Skaters who had placed in the top six at the 2011 Worlds were given a newly introduced option of competing at three Grand Prix events. Březina elected to do so and was assigned to 2011 Skate America, 2011 Trophée Eric Bompard, and 2011 Cup of Russia. At Skate America, he won the short program by 8.39 points and placed third in the free skate to win the gold medal overall. Březina won the bronze medal in France, which qualified him for the Grand Prix Final. He then placed fourth in the Cup of Russia. He was sixth at the Grand Prix Final. At the 2012 World Championships, Březina picked up a small silver medal for the short program and finished sixth overall after the free skate. In April 2012, he changed coaches from Starec and Fajfr to Viktor Petrenko. He trained at the Ice House in Hackensack, New Jersey.

2012–2013 season 
Březina finished sixth at 2012 Skate America and won the bronze medal at the 2012 Rostelecom Cup. He withdrew from the Czech Championships due to a fever. He dislocated his shoulder during practice on 21 January at the 2013 European Championships but went on to win bronze, his first European medal.

2013–2014 season 
In February 2014, Březina placed tenth at the Winter Olympics in Sochi, Russia. His next event was the 2014 World Championships in Saitama, Japan. He withdrew after the short program on 26 March, having pulled ligaments in his right ankle on the triple flip take-off. His ankle was immediately put into a cast, and he recovered in two weeks. Due to the high cost of training in the United States, he decided in June 2014 to rejoin Karel Fajfr in Oberstdorf.

2014–2015 season 
Březina began the season with two silver medals at his Challenger events, the Golden Spin of Zagreb and Nebelhorn Trophy/  After finishing seventh at the 2014 Skate Canada International, he won the bronze medal at the 2014 Rostelecom Cup.  He placed fifth at the 2015 European Championships and fifteenth at the 2015 World Championships.

2015–2016 season 
His first event of the season was the 2015 Lombardia Trophy, which was not a Challenger event for that particular season. Following a sixth-place finish at Nebelhorn, Brezina placed eighth and seventh at these two Grand Prix assignments, Skate Canada International and the NHK Trophy.  He went on to place tenth at Europeans and ninth at Worlds.

In the spring of 2016, Březina decided to train with Rafael Arutyunyan in California.

2016–2017 season 
Březina placed fourth at Skate Canada International and tenth at the Cup of China.

In December 2016, he placed first in the short program at the Four Nationals; he withdrew after injuring his arm during the free skate.  He placed twelfth at Europeans.

Březina twisted his ankle three weeks before the 2017 World Championships in Helsinki. He finished eighteenth at the event in Finland, earning a spot for the Czech Republic at the 2018 Winter Olympics.

2017–2018 season 
Beginning with two events on the Challenger Series, Březina placed ninth at the U.S. International Classic and sixth at the Finlandia Trophy.  He went on to place sixth at Skate Canada International and ninth at NHK Trophy.

Following an eighth-place finish at Europeans, Březina competed at his third Olympic Games in Pyeongchang, South Korea.  He placed sixteenth.  The season concluded at the 2018 World Championships in Milan, Italy, where he placed tenth, setting a new personal best in the free skate.

2018–2019 season 
Březina began the season with a silver medal at the 2018 U.S. International Classic, his first Challenger Series medal in four years. He followed that up with a silver medal at the 2018 Skate America event, his first Grand Prix medal since his bronze at Rostelecom four years earlier. At his second Grand Prix event, the 2018 Grand Prix of Helsinki, he set new personal bests in the short program and overall score to win a second silver medal.

His results qualified him for the Grand Prix Final, only the second time in his career he had done so and the first time in seven years. Březina placed fourth at the Final, finishing 8.23 points behind Cha Jun-hwan after doubling a jump in his short program and falling on a quad Salchow in the free skate. At the European Championships he placed eighth in the short program and moved up to seventh overall after placing sixth in the free program.

Finishing his season at the 2019 World Championships, Březina placed eighth in the short program.  He remained in eighth place following the free skate, despite a single fall on a triple flip attempt.

2019–2020 season 
Březina opted not to begin his season with a Challenger event, instead competing at the 2019 Shanghai Trophy, where he placed fourth.  Returning to Skate America, he placed fifth in the short program despite jump errors.  After doubling numerous jumps in his free skate, he fell to eleventh place.  He was ninth at the 2019 Rostelecom Cup.

Competing at the 2020 European Championships, Březina placed first in the short program despite performing only a quad-double in his combination jump, winning a gold small medal.  He said he was undecided about whether it would be his final competition.  He fell twice in the free skate on quad Salchow attempts, placing eleventh in that segment and falling to seventh place overall.  He was scheduled to compete at the 2020 World Championships in Montreal, but these were cancelled as a result of the COVID-19 pandemic.

2020–2021 season 
Březina was assigned to compete at the 2020 Skate America but withdrew due to a fall in training. He was allowed to submit virtual competitive programs to the 2021 Four National Championships, winning the gold medal. His only live event of the season was the 2021 World Championships in Stockholm, where he placed nineteenth. This result qualified one berth for the Czech Republic at the 2022 Winter Olympics in Beijing.

2021–2022 season 
Březina opened his season with a win at the 2021 U.S. International Classic. Following the results of the 2021 CS Nebelhorn Trophy, he was announced as part of the Czech Olympic team, this time alongside his sister Eliška. Competing on the Grand Prix at the 2021 Skate America, he finished in sixth. At the 2021 Rostelecom Cup, he finished in tenth place. Discussing his results afterward, he cited his work with a mental coach as having improved his mindset, noting, "I wish I would have worked with a mental coach when I was younger. Maybe my career would have looked different."

At the 2022 European Championships, Březina had a poor short program and finished in fifteenth place in that segment. He was fifth in the free skate, rising to tenth place overall.

Březina began the 2022 Winter Olympics as the Czech entry in the men's short program of the Olympic team event. He placed seventh in the segment, securing four points for the Czech team. They ultimately did not advance to the second phase of the competition, finishing eighth. In the individual event, he placed twenty-fifth in the short program, not advancing to the free program. He announced his retirement shortly after the event.

Programs

Competitive highlights
GP: Grand Prix; CS: Challenger Series; JGP: Junior Grand Prix

Detailed results 

Small medals for short and free programs awarded only at ISU Championships. At team events, medals awarded for team results only.

Senior career

Notes

References

External links

 
 

1990 births
Czech male single skaters
Living people
Figure skaters from Brno
Figure skaters at the 2010 Winter Olympics
Figure skaters at the 2014 Winter Olympics
Figure skaters at the 2018 Winter Olympics
Figure skaters at the 2022 Winter Olympics
Olympic figure skaters of the Czech Republic
World Junior Figure Skating Championships medalists
European Figure Skating Championships medalists
Competitors at the 2017 Winter Universiade